Martin Krumbiegel (born 1963) is a German classical tenor, conductor and musicologist. A member of the Thomanerchor as a boy, he is mostly active in oratorios, cantatas and vocal chamber music of the 17th and 18th century.

Career 

Martin Krumbiegel was born in Leipzig, the brother of Sebastian Krumbiegel, and he was a member of the Thomanerchor from 1973 to 1982. He studied musicology at the University of Leipzig and graduated in 1994 with a doctorate. He also undertook private voice training with Andreas Sommerfeld.

Since 1987 he has performed as a concert and oratorio singer, including appearances at the Leipzig Gewandhaus, the Berlin Schauspielhaus, the Semperoper in Dresden and the Kölner Philharmonie. He has regularly collaborated as a soloist with the Bach cantata performances of the Thomanerchor. Tours abroad led him to the Czech Republic, France, the Netherlands, Sweden and Lithuania.

As a teacher, he was first a lecturer at the University of Music and Theatre Leipzig, appointed professor of the Institute of Musicology on 14 April 2010.

He has been the artistic director of the Leipziger Oratorienchor since it was founded in 1993. From 2001 he has been the conductor of the ensemble Capella Fidicinia Leipzig, dedicated to the music of the 15th to 18th century. From 2008, Krumbiegel has been the artistic director of the vocal ensemble Herrenwieser Vokalensemble, a group of 18 singers from Germany and Switzerland who meet once a year and tour Brandenburg, with a repertoire from early Baroque to contemporary.

Krumbiegel has recorded for disk (CD), radio and television. With the Leipziger Oratorienchor, he recorded live major choral works by Bach, his Mass in B minor (1999 and 2003), St John Passion (2002), Christmas Oratorio (2002) and St Matthew Passion (2006), singing the part of the Evangelist himself in the Passions. In the Bach year 2000, he performed in concerts in St. Martin, Idstein, including Bach's cantatas for Easter Erfreut euch, ihr Herzen, BWV 66, and for Pentecost Sunday Erschallet, ihr Lieder, erklinget, ihr Saiten! BWV 172, as well as songs such as "So oft ich meine Tobackspfeife", BWV 515, from the Notebook for Anna Magdalena Bach, also known as the "Pipe Aria".

References

External links 

 
 

1963 births
German male conductors (music)
German musicologists
German operatic tenors
Living people
Musicians from Leipzig
Leipzig University alumni
21st-century German conductors (music)
21st-century German male musicians